Avinash Kamalakar Dixit (born 6 August 1944) is an Indian-American economist.  He is the John J. F. Sherrerd '52 University Professor of Economics Emeritus at Princeton University, and has been Distinguished Adjunct Professor of Economics at Lingnan University (Hong Kong), senior research fellow at Nuffield College, Oxford and Sanjaya Lall Senior Visiting Research Fellow at Green Templeton College, Oxford.

Education 
Dixit received a B.Sc. from University of Mumbai (St. Xavier's College) in 1963 in Mathematics and Physics, a B.A. from Cambridge University in 1965 in Mathematics (Corpus Christi College, First Class), and a Ph.D. in 1968 from the Massachusetts Institute of Technology in Economics.

Career 
Dixit is the John J. F. Sherrerd '52 University Professor of Economics at Princeton University since July 1989, and Emeritus since 2010. He was also Distinguished Adjunct Professor of Economics at Lingnan University (Hong Kong), senior research fellow at Nuffield College, Oxford and Sanjaya Lall senior visiting research fellow at Green Templeton College, Oxford. He previously taught at Massachusetts Institute of Technology, at the University of California, Berkeley, at Balliol College, Oxford and at the University of Warwick. In 1994 Dixit received the first-ever CES Fellow Award from the Center for Economic Studies at the University of Munich in Germany. In January 2016, India conferred the Padma Vibhushan -  the second highest of India's civilian honors to Dr. Dixit.

Dixit has also held visiting scholar positions at the International Monetary Fund and the Russell Sage Foundation. He was President of the Econometric Society in 2001, and was Vice-President (2002) and President (2008) of the American Economic Association. He was elected to the American Academy of Arts and Sciences in 1992, the National Academy of Sciences in 2005, and the American Philosophical Society in 2010. He has also been on the Social Sciences jury for the Infosys Prize from 2011.

With Robert Pindyck he is author of "Investment Under Uncertainty" (Princeton University Press, 1994), the first textbook exclusively about the real options approach to investments, and described as "a born-classic"  in view of its importance to the theory.

Selected publications 
 1976. The Theory of Equilibrium Growth. Oxford University Press.
1977. "Monopolistic Competition and Optimum Product Diversity", The American Economic Review, vol. 67, no. 3, p. 297–308, with Joseph E. Stiglitz.
 1980. Theory of International Trade, with Victor Norman. Cambridge University Press
 [1976] 1990. Optimization in Economic Theory, 2nd ed., Oxford.  Description and contents preview.
 1991. Thinking Strategically: The Competitive Edge in Business, Politics, and Everyday Life, with Barry Nalebuff, New York: W.W. Norton.
 1993. The Art of Smooth Pasting, Vol. 55 of series Fundamentals of Pure and Applied Economics, eds. Jacques Lesourne and Hugo Sonnenschein. Reading, UK: Harwood Academic Publishers.
 1996a.Investment Under Uncertainty, co-authored by Robert Pindyck. Princeton University Press.
 1996b. The Making of Economic Policy: A Transaction Cost Politics Perspective (Munich Lectures in Economics), M.I.T. Press. Description.
 2004. Lawlessness and Economics: Alternative Modes of Governance], Gorman Lectures in Economics, University College London, Princeton University Press. Description and ch. 1, Economics With and Without the Law.
  2008a. The Art of Strategy: A Game-Theorist's Guide to Success in Business and Life with Barry Nalebuff, New York: W. W. Norton.
  2008b. "economic governance," in The New Palgrave Dictionary of Economics, 2nd Edition. Abstract.
  2009. Games of Strategy, with Susan Skeath, New York: W. W. Norton, 1999, 5th edition 2020.
  2014. Microeconomics: A Very Short Introduction, Oxford University Press.

References

External links 
 Short biography
 Curriculum vitae
 Recent writings
 
 

1944 births
Living people
Indian emigrants to the United States
Academics of the University of Warwick
21st-century American economists
Fellows of the Econometric Society
American male writers of Indian descent
MIT School of Humanities, Arts, and Social Sciences alumni
Members of the United States National Academy of Sciences
Princeton University faculty
Fellows of Balliol College, Oxford
Fellows of Nuffield College, Oxford
St. Xavier's College, Mumbai alumni
Presidents of the Econometric Society
20th-century American non-fiction writers
21st-century American non-fiction writers
20th-century Indian economists
Trade economists
21st-century Indian economists
Financial economists
Real options
American academics of Indian descent
Recipients of the Padma Vibhushan in literature & education
Presidents of the American Economic Association
Writers from Mumbai
20th-century American male writers
Distinguished Fellows of the American Economic Association
American male non-fiction writers
Scientists from Mumbai
Nancy L. Schwartz Memorial Lecture speakers
Corresponding Fellows of the British Academy
21st-century American male writers
Indian economists